Angel's Rage is a 2006 Canadian drama film directed by Dan Bigras. The film earned two Genie Award nominations in the categories of Best Achievement in Art Direction/Production Design and Best Achievement in Music - Original Song for the song "L'Astronaute".

References

External links 

 
 

2006 films
Films shot in Montreal
2000s French-language films
2006 drama films
Canadian drama films
Quebec films
French-language Canadian films
2000s Canadian films